Anita Chui is a Hong Kong-born actress and singer. Chui has acted in both local and international films, and is the author of two books. Her debut single, Get it Right, was released in 2022.

Early life
Chui was born into a middle-class family in Hong Kong.  She began study using the Kumon Method at the age of five, focusing on English and mathematics. Chui started piano lessons at the age of three, passing her Associated Board of the Royal Schools of Music (ABRSM) Grade 8 exam when she was 13. Her parents divorced when she was around 18.

Education 
Chui completed her primary education at the York International Kindergarten and York English Primary School in Kowloon Tong, Hong Kong. For her secondary education, she was assigned to the Pentecostal School in Ho Man Tin, Hong Kong.

Chui was active in various sports and performing arts at school. During her time at secondary school, she represented the Pentecostal School in the English poetry competition at the Hong Kong Schools Speech Festival. Chui was a soprano in the school's choir and a member of the school volleyball team.

Chui's parents sent her to the United Kingdom for further study after her secondary schooling. While in the United Kingdom, she received a bachelor's degree in accounting and marketing from the University of Central Lancashire. Chui started a master's degree course in business administration at the University of Sheffield but dropped out after her first year. During her time at the University of Sheffield, Chui represented the university as part of their cheerleading team.

Career

Acting 
During the second year of her master's degree, Chui met Paco re Wong, the manager of Sun Entertainment Culture, during her term-break in Hong Kong. After the meeting, she decided to abandon her master's degree and stay in Hong Kong to sign a five-year acting contract with Sun Entertainment Culture. In the same year, Sun Entertainment Culture arranged for Chui to receive acting tuition; some of her tutors included Jim Chim Sui-man and Kearen Pang.

Chui began her acting career in Hong Kong: from 2012 to 2017, she participated in over 20 local Hong Kong films. In February 2014, Chui was cast in Special Female Force by the director Wilson Chin Kwok-Wai. This was her first lead role in a film. Special Female Force was filmed in Malaysia from April 2014 to July 2014 and was released in the summer of 2016.

In 2016, Chui published a photo book: Sweat Anita. The photo book was shot in Hong Kong and Macau by Ronald Lam and took seven days to complete.

After a discussion with Paco re Wong in 2017, Chui left Sun Entertainment Culture to study acting and film production at the Met Film School, London. At the same time, she recruited her own team to manage her artistic career, forming the Golden Shadow Entertainment company.

On 9 May 2018, Chui was invited by Sasha Waseem, a Fashion TV journalist, to attend the red carpet for a screening of Sorry Angel at the 71st Cannes Film Festival. She attended with the actress Patricia Gloria Contreras, wearing a gown from the designer . At Cannes, Chui met Charles Guérin Surville, a French director. Chui and Surville decided to produce a film together called Follia. Filming took place in Italy and France until May 2019. Following the film's completion, Chui was invited by Caroline Scheufele, co-president of Chopard, to attend the red carpet at the 72nd Cannes Film Festival closing ceremony.

During her time in Europe, Chui worked on writing her second book, Anita's Keto Diet, which is about the ketogenic diet. Writing the book took her three months; a seven-day photo shoot for the book was then taken in Tokyo, Japan. The book was launched in July 2019 in Hong Kong and was published in several Asian countries.

From December 2019 to March 2020, Chui went to Los Angeles, United States, to audition for a Hollywood action movie. She received a supporting role. For the film, Chui began to receive movie stunt training from Tim Storms. At the beginning of the COVID-19 pandemic, production was postponed due to lockdown. During the pandemic, Chui went back to Hong Kong.

In 2021, the British-Chinese producer and director Bizhan Tong cast Chui in the film Lockdown. The entire film was filmed separately in United States, United Kingdom, Italy and Hong Kong. Chui filmed her part at an indoor ATV studio in Hong Kong.

Music 
During the COVID-19 pandemic, Chui took vocal tutoring in Hong Kong with Christine Samson,  and Jessica Lam. She also took pop piano lessons with John Weiffenbach at the New Wave Music, and dance classes at the Ones To Watch Dance Company. Chui also received training on her British and American accents over Zoom with Tara Chiusano.

In January 2022, Chui signed a ten-year contract with Honger Music Venture during the company's 15th anniversary. Her debut song, Get It Right, was officially released on 14 June 2022 during press conference at the Kowloon Shangri-La hotel ballroom.

Filmography

TV programmes
I Love HK (2016) – variety show on TVB
Chest of Tricks (2017) – ViuTV variety show
我的家庭醫生3之等價交換 (2018) – on RTHK

Films
Lan Kwai Fong 2 (2012)
Hotel Deluxe (2013)
SDU: Sex Duties Unit (2013)
The Best Plan Is No Plan (2013)
Delete My Love (2014)
Imprisoned: Survival Guide for Rich and Prodigal (2015)
Lost in Hong Kong (2015)
Love Detective (2015)
From Vegas to Macau III (2016)
PG Love (2016)
Robbery (2016)
Special Female Force (2016)
L for Love L for Lies (2017)
Zombiology: Enjoy Yourself Tonight (2017)
The Cursed (2018)
Lion Rock (2019)
Islamophobia (2022)
我的前世情人 (2022)
LOCKDOWN (2022)
FOLLIA (2022)

Web drama 
OCTB (2017)
The Trading Floor (2018)

Adversitements 
Prince Cake Shop (2013)
Perfection Wedding Dress (2013)
Miai Jewelry (2013)
Reface Clinic (2018)
The Walnut Shop (2020)
Durex (2020)
Biggerfit (2020)
re:HEALTH (2021)

Discography

Singles
Get it Right (2022)

Publications
Sweat Anita (2016)
Anita Chui Keto Diet (2019)

References

21st-century Hong Kong actresses
1988 births
Living people
Hong Kong film actresses
Hong Kong television actresses
Hong Kong singers